Poppler may refer to:
"Popplers", a fictional food in "The Problem with Popplers", an episode of the television series Futurama
Poppler (software), PDF rendering library

See also
Populus (disambiguation)
Popple (disambiguation)
Popples, a series of fantasy characters created by Those Characters From Cleveland (TCFC), a subsidiary company of American Greetings